Amur Railroad Corrective Labor Camp (Amurlag) was a subdivision of GULAG which existed during 1938-1941. It was created from the disbanded Bamlag. Its administration was headquartered in the settlement of Svobodny, Amur Oblast. Its main activity was railroad construction. Its peak headcount was about 125,000 (1938).

Notable convicts

Nikolai Starostin, Russian footballer and ice hockey player

See also

Amurlag (1947—1953)

References

Camps of the Gulag
History of Amur Oblast
History of the Russian Far East
1938 establishments in the Soviet Union
Rail transport in the Soviet Union